Lex orandi, lex credendi (Latin: "the law of what is prayed [is] the law of what is believed"), sometimes expanded as Lex orandi, lex credendi, lex vivendi (Latin: "the law of what is prayed [is] what is believed [is] the law of what is lived"), is a motto in Christian tradition, which means that prayer and belief are integral to each other and that liturgy is not distinct from theology. It refers to the relationship between worship and belief. As an ancient Christian principle it provided a measure for developing the ancient Christian creeds, the canon of scripture, and other doctrinal matters. It is based on the prayer texts of the Church, that is, the Church's liturgy. In the Early Church, there was liturgical tradition before there was a common creed, and before there was an officially sanctioned biblical canon. These liturgical traditions provided the theological (and doctrinal) framework for establishing the creeds and canon.

Origin
An early account of the maxim is found in Prosper of Aquitaine's eighth book on the authority of the past bishops of the Apostolic See concerning the grace of God and free will, "Let us consider the sacraments of priestly prayers, which having been handed down by the apostles are celebrated uniformly throughout the whole world and in every Catholic Church so that the law of praying might establish the law of believing [ut legem credendi lex statuat supplicandi]". "Credendi" and "supplicandi" are gerunds which are oblique cases of the infinitive, and so can be translated into English as "of praying/believing," or just "of prayer/belief," respectively. Whereas the more general maxim "Lex orandi, lex credendi" suggests a general relationship between the two, Prosper of Aquitaine's formulation establishes the credence of certain Christian doctrines by placing their source in the Church's authentic liturgical rites, thus describing the liturgy itself as a deposit of extra-Biblical Christian revelation (part of a body of extra-Biblical beliefs known more collectively as Apostolic tradition), to which, in addition to Scripture, those who wished to know true doctrine could also refer.  This would later be contradicted by the "Sola Scriptura" principle of Martin Luther and the Reformation.

Catholicism
The principle is considered very important in Catholic theology. The Catechism of the Catholic Church states: "The Church's faith precedes the faith of the believer who is invited to adhere to it. When the Church celebrates the sacraments, she confesses the faith received from the apostles – whence the ancient saying: lex orandi, lex credendi, or legem credendi lex statuat supplicandi (the law of praying is to establish the law of believing) according to Prosper of Aquitaine. The law of prayer is the law of faith: the Church believes as she prays. Liturgy is a constitutive element of the holy and living Tradition."

At a symposium held in connection with the publication of a set of reproductions of the first editions of the Tridentine liturgical texts, including the Roman Missal and the Roman Breviary, Archbishop Piero Marini, former Master of Pontifical Liturgical Celebrations, presented a paper entitled "Returning to the Sources", in which he said: "It is above all in the Liturgy that renewal cannot do without a sincere and profound return to the sources: sources of that which is celebrated and sources of that which is believed (lex orandi, lex credendi). Digging deep into the sources, the theologian and the liturgist aim simply to penetrate the profundity of the mystery of the faith as it has shown itself in the concrete life of the Church all through her history."

In the encyclical Mediator Dei, Pope Pius XII elucidates this principle and address errors that can arise from a misunderstanding of it.  He states:
46. On this subject We judge it Our duty to rectify an attitude with which you are doubtless familiar, Venerable Brethren. We refer to the error and fallacious reasoning of those who have claimed that the sacred liturgy is a kind of proving ground for the truths to be held of faith, meaning by this that the Church is obliged to declare such a doctrine sound when it is found to have produced fruits of piety and sanctity through the sacred rites of the liturgy, and to reject it otherwise. Hence the epigram, "Lex orandi, lex credendi" - the law for prayer is the law for faith.
47. But this is not what the Church teaches and enjoins. The worship she offers to God, all good and great, is a continuous profession of Catholic faith and a continuous exercise of hope and charity, as Augustine puts it tersely. "God is to be worshipped," he says, "by faith, hope and charity." In the sacred liturgy we profess the Catholic faith explicitly and openly, not only by the celebration of the mysteries, and by offering the holy sacrifice and administering the sacraments, but also by saying or singing the credo or Symbol of the faith - it is indeed the sign and badge, as it were, of the Christian - along with other texts, and likewise by the reading of holy scripture, written under the inspiration of the Holy Ghost. The entire liturgy, therefore, has the Catholic faith for its content, inasmuch as it bears public witness to the faith of the Church.
48. For this reason, whenever there was question of defining a truth revealed by God, the Sovereign Pontiff and the Councils in their recourse to the "theological sources," as they are called, have not seldom drawn many an argument from this sacred science of the liturgy. For an example in point, Our predecessor of immortal memory, Pius IX, so argued when he proclaimed the Immaculate Conception of the Virgin Mary. Similarly during the discussion of a doubtful or controversial truth, the Church and the Holy Fathers have not failed to look to the age-old and age-honoured sacred rites for enlightenment. Hence the well-known and venerable maxim, "Legem credendi lex statuat supplicandi" - let the rule for prayer determine the rule of belief. The sacred liturgy, consequently, does not decide or determine independently and of itself what is of Catholic faith. More properly, since the liturgy is also a profession of eternal truths, and subject, as such, to the supreme teaching authority of the Church, it can supply proofs and testimony, quite clearly, of no little value, towards the determination of a particular point of Christian doctrine. But if one desires to differentiate and describe the relationship between faith and the sacred liturgy in absolute and general terms, it is perfectly correct to say, "Lex credendi legem statuat supplicandi" - let the rule of belief determine the rule of prayer. The same holds true for the other theological virtues also, "In . . . fide, spe, caritate continuato desiderio semper oramus" - we pray always, with constant yearning in faith, hope and charity.

Anglicanism

Lex orandi, lex credendi is a fundamental character of Anglicanism.  Its importance is due primarily to the fact that the Scriptures are the primary source of authority for Anglican theology.  Although other traditions take their name from their founding theologian (e.g., Calvinism, Lutheranism, Mennonite, or Zwinglianism) the Anglican Reformation is no less appreciative to the father of the English Reformation, Archbishop Thomas Cranmer.  The position of the English Reformation is that the church is subject to Scripture, whereas Anglo-Catholicism affirms that Tradition is equal to Scripture, which implies that the institutional church possesses equal control over the content of orthodox Christian doctrine.  This difference is the great divide between the Protestant and English Reformation and the Roman Catholic Church and the Anglo-Catholic sympathizers with Rome.  The via media is an attempt to revise the English Reformation in a more Roman Catholic direction. Other Anglicans would disagree that Scripture is the primary source of authority and insist that Scripture, Tradition and Reason must be held in tension as of equal import and authority.  While this sentiment is often attributed to Richard Hooker, Hooker himself believed that to Scripture "first place both of credit and obedience is due", indeed the phrase Lex orandi lex credendi states that it is in our worship that we express our beliefs and that, in itself, is a form of authority.

Instead, Anglicans have what are called the Anglican Formularies to guide Anglican theology and practice.  The Anglican Formularies are the Thirty-nine Articles of Religion, the 1662 Book of Common Prayer, and the Ordinal.  The Archbishop of Canterbury, Thomas Cranmer, principal author of the prototypical 1549 Book of Common Prayer and the more reformed 1552 prayer book, could be said to be the first Anglican theologian.  His theology is expressed in the selection, arrangement, and composition of prayers and exhortations, the selection and arrangement of daily scripture readings (the lectionary), and in the stipulation of the rubrics for permissible liturgical action and any variations in the prayers and exhortations – though, of course, his selections and arrangements were based on pre-existing continental Reformed theology.  Gregory Dix, the Anglo-Catholic theologian has well said that Thomas Cranmer was a liturgical genius who helped to make the doctrine of justification by faith alone part of the common faith of England through the later 1662 Book of Common Prayer, which was faithful to the 1552 Book of Common Prayer.  Elizabeth I, being Protestant, wanted to maintain the Protestant faith in England, though she did not allow the Puritans to regain control. "Justification through faith alone" is not a phrase much used in "broad church" Anglicanism. Similarly the term "Protestant" sits uncomfortably with many Anglicans. Indeed, Anglicanism is better described as "Catholic and Reformed".

Given its locus in the worship of the Church, Anglican theology tends to be Augustinian and Reformed and embodies a strongly evangelical liturgy. The genius of Cranmer was in employing the principle of lex orandi, lex credendi to teach the English congregations the Reformed doctrines of grace and the sine qua non of the Gospel, justification by faith alone.

Orthodoxy
Eastern Orthodoxy's Patriarch Bartholomew I of Constantinople quoted this phrase in Latin on the occasion of the visit of Pope Benedict XVI, drawing from the phrase the lesson that, "in liturgy, we are reminded of the need to reach unity in faith as well as in prayer." Rather than regarding Tradition as something beneath Scripture or parallel to Scripture, Orthodox Christians consider Scripture the culmination and supreme expression of the church's divinely communicated Tradition.  Councils and creeds recognized as authoritative are interpreted only as defining and more fully explicating the orthodox faith handed to the apostles, without adding to it.

See also

Adiaphora
Orthopraxis
Christian theological praxis
Oral tradition
Ritualism

References

Bibliography

External links
 .
 .
"Lex orandi, lex credendi": Cautionary Notes
Fournier, Keith, Rev. Mr. Lex Orandi, lex credendi. As we pray, as we live.
Brother André Marie, M.I.C.M. Lex Orandi, Lex Credendi

Christian worship and liturgy
Latin religious words and phrases